Bani ʿAbbas is a sub-district located in the Al-Mawasit District, Taiz Governorate, Yemen. Bani ʿAbbas had a population of 4,916 according to the 2004 census.

Villages
 Atab
An-Nuwidrah
Al-Mahjar
Am-Mushiraḥ
 Al-Manhi
 Al-Agad al-aʿla
Al-Agad al-Asfal

References

Sub-districts in Al-Mawasit District